The BMW 503 is a two-door 2+2 gran turismo in both Coupé and Cabriolet form  manufactured by German automaker BMW from 1956 until 1959.  The company developed the 503 alongside the 507 roadster in an attempt to sell a significant number of luxury cars in the United States. The 503 and 507 cost about twice their projected price and did not recover their costs. During production from May 1956 to March 1959, 413 units of the 503 were built, 139 of which were Cabriolets. Even though it was a prestige model it resulted in heavy losses for BMW.

Concept and design
Hanns Grewenig, Deutche Bank’s Nominee and Commercial Director of BMW, repeatedly requested the development of a sports car based on their 501 and 502 luxury cars, and which could take advantage of their superb new 3.2 V8 all alloy engine. He vetoed a proposal by Fritz Feidler (Chief Engineer)to develop a small car called the 331 which looked a little like a Fiat Topolino on the basis that what BMW needed was a new luxury car more in keeping with its upmarket image. He also felt that BMW did not have the capacity then to manufacture in quantity, but could make a smaller number of luxury cars with a higher profit margin per unit. 
In early 1954, influenced by the public reaction to the Mercedes-Benz 300 SL and 220 SC show cars in New York in February 1954, the management of BMW approved the project.

The initial designs for the 503 were the work of Kurt Bredschneider, head of the body department, and he produced the preliminary drawings which showed the bodywork that went through to the final design pretty much unchanged. Max Hoffman, an influential automobile importer in the United States, saw early design sketches by BMW's Ernst Loof for the subsequent 507 and suggested to industrial designer Albrecht von Goertz that he should submit design proposals to BMW for both cars.  Based on these proposals, BMW contracted Goertz to consider the existing design of the 503 and to design the 507 in November 1954. Bredschneider in the meanwhile was suffering from problems caused by severe stress and left the Company. His design however survived as Goertz made only minor amendments to it. Ernst Loof was upset that his design for the 507 was sidelined. He died from a brain tumour in 1956.

The 503 was noted for having a cleaner and more modern design than the "Baroque Angel" 501-based sedans. The cabriolet version of the 503 was the first European convertible with an electro hydraulic hood and windows. Only 3 RHD cabriolets were hand made for the British market.

Engineering and development
Tasked with designing rolling chassis for two cars while using as much as possible from the existing 502 , engineer Fritz Fiedler designed two versions of a new ladder frame, one with the same wheelbase as the 502, and one with a shortened wheelbase. The long-wheelbase version was used in the 503. Both cars used the steering system and a variant of the front suspension system from the 502; the 503 also used the 502's rear suspension. As originally designed, the 503 used the 502's remote gearbox placement and column change.  Both cars used the braking system developed for the 502, using drum brakes with vacuum assist. From 1957 all 503s were fitted with discs on the front as a result of recommendations from John Surtees who had bought a 507.  Later he also bought a 503. All 503s were configured for left hand drive except for 3 Coupés, and 3 Cabriolets custom built for individual UK buyers.

The massive perimeter chassis (so designed to keep driver and passengers safe in a collision) was constructed of sheet steel, as was the bulkhead, inner wings and some body bracing.  The bodywork, bonnet, doors and bootlid were made of aluminium/magnesium alloy, the original aluminium having found to be too soft on the prototypes. The dashboard assembly was another hefty cast aluminium structure, with the cast glove box lid weighing as much as an ordinary dashboard on lesser cars. The side vents on the dashboard were discontinued in February 1957, the resulting hole being covered by a blanking plate being welded in which occasionally caused corrosion problems around the weld later on.   It was intended that Baur should manufacture the bodies, and indeed they produced a prototype, but in the end they were hand built in house. Despite some claims by owners and auction houses, no 503 bodies were either designed or built by Bertone.

The Mark 2 version from September 1957 resulted in few outward changes. The chrome trim strip along the side remained straight at the rear, rather than kicking up at an angle.  The ashtray moved from beneath the dash to adjacent to the speaker grill above it.  It should also be noted that each handbuilt car was different with customers often specifying their own requirements.

Both cars used the 3.2 version of the  V8 engine designed by chief engineer Alfred Böning and  developed for the 502, but with two carburettors and with an improved lubrication system using a chain-driven oil pump. The 503's V8 had a compression ratio of 7.5:1 and yielded  at 4800 rpm.   Some UK 503s were delivered tuned to 507 specification, either by BMW or, before delivery,  by AFN Ltd, the BMW  Concessionaires for the UK,  The engines of these developed 150 bhp+.

The 503 had sixteen inch wheels and standard final drive ratio of 3.90:1, A final drive ratio of 3.42:1 was optional. Some cars were ordered with uprated engines with increased performance from standard.

Also for the Mark 2 from September 1957, the 503's drivetrain was revised. The gearbox was bolted to the engine and the gear lever was moved from the steering column to the floor.  All RHD cars had floor changes.

Reception
Hoffman had wanted BMW's sports and GT cars to be positioned between Triumph's sports cars and the Mercedes-Benz 300SL, at a selling price close to US$5,000 ($ in  dollars ). He told BMW he would order thousands of their sports cars at a purchase price of DM12,000. BMW, however, saw themselves as catering to the wealthy and aristocratic, and were not interested in cut price sports cars.  They made the 503 to show that they could produce a car which could rival the best that their competitors could produce in the fields of brilliance of design, quality of engineering and using advanced materials and technology. And they succeeded.   Hanns Grewenig said at the time that BMW Cars should be the calling card of Germany.

After its introduction at the Frankfurt Motor Show in September 1955, the 503 began production in May 1956 with a selling price of DM29,500, while the 507 roadster sold for DM26,500 when it began production seven months later, twice the price that Hoffman had hoped for.

Battista "Pinin" Farina, felt the 503 was superior in design to the 507, However, while neither the 503 nor the 507 sold well enough to earn a profit, the larger, more luxurious, more elegant, and more expensive 503 sold 412 units to the 507 roadster's 253. The problem with the 507 Roadster was that the performance did not match its looks or the price in the US market that was used to big V8 cars.  Another difficulty for both cars was that Hoffman took fright at the very high price and cancelled his arrangement with BMW. Thus BMW had no dealership or servicing arrangements in the US which potential purchasers were wary about.  Also there was still a marked reluctance of buyers from allied countries to buy cars from manufacturers who had comparatively recently been making weapons of war for Germany.  These difficulties weren't helped by the teething problems of the hotted up V8 which had a tendency to overheat in city traffic, and run cool in winter.  The Zenith carburettors also tended to overflow their float chambers with the potential of fire causing BMW to mount the carburettors on an alloy tray with a run off pipe to divert any excess fuel away from the exhausts.  All these matters were taken care of during production.

Inexplicably BMW did very little to promote the 503 in America bearing in mind the extraordinary qualities of the car. Most  of their efforts went on the 507 which sold in tiny numbers in the US.

The 503 did better amongst the upper levels of society in Europe, (particularly Germany and Switzerland) with many going to film stars (Kurt Jurgens and others) Heads of State (eg Tito) and the nobility (eg Count Faber-Castell) and it won numerous gold medals in International shows at the time. Production ended in March 1959.

Legacy
The 503 was BMW's first postwar sports coupe. It was replaced by the Bertone-bodied BMW 3200 CS in 1962.

A 1956 BMW 503 Cabriolet with Portuguese plates was driven by the George C. Scott character in the 1971 movie The Last Run.

A 1957 BMW 503 Coupé appears in the BBC drama Father Brown, episode 2, series 4, The Brewer's Daughter, first broadcast January 2016. That car was right hand drive.

John Surtees CBE, the former Motorcycle and F1 World Champion bought a 1957 RHD 503 Cabriolet in 1992, which he restored and owned up until his death in 2017. It was one of only two remaining of the three built.

References

Citations

Sources

Books and journals

Web sites

503
Grand tourers
Rear-wheel-drive vehicles
Cars introduced in 1955